A mathematical object X has the fixed-point property if every suitably well-behaved mapping from X to itself has a fixed point. The term is most commonly used to describe topological spaces on which every continuous mapping has a fixed point.  But another use is in order theory, where a partially ordered set P is said to have the fixed point property if every increasing function on P has a fixed point.

Definition
Let A be an object in the concrete category C.  Then A has the fixed-point property if every morphism (i.e., every function)  has a fixed point.

The most common usage is when C = Top is the category of topological spaces.  Then a topological space X has the fixed-point property if every continuous map  has a fixed point.

Examples

Singletons
In the category of sets, the objects with the fixed-point property are precisely the singletons.

The closed interval
The closed interval [0,1] has the fixed point property: Let f: [0,1] → [0,1] be a continuous mapping. If f(0) = 0 or f(1) = 1, then our mapping has a fixed point at 0 or 1. If not, then f(0) > 0 and f(1) − 1 < 0. Thus the function g(x) = f(x) − x is a continuous real valued function which is positive at x = 0 and negative at x = 1. By the intermediate value theorem, there is some point x0 with g(x0) = 0, which is to say that f(x0) − x0 = 0, and so x0 is a fixed point.

The open interval does not have the fixed-point property. The mapping f(x) = x2 has no fixed point on the interval (0,1).

The closed disc
The closed interval is a special case of the closed disc, which in any finite dimension has the fixed-point property by the Brouwer fixed-point theorem.

Topology
A retract A of a space X with the fixed-point property also has the fixed-point property. That is, there is  such that . Since  we have that  and therefore 

A topological space has the fixed-point property if and only if its identity map is universal.

A product of spaces with the fixed-point property in general fails to have the fixed-point property even if one of the spaces is the closed real interval.

The  FPP is a topological invariant, i.e. is preserved by any homeomorphism. The FPP is also preserved by any retraction.

According to Brouwer fixed point theorem every compact and convex subset of a Euclidean space has the FPP. More generally, according to the Schauder-Tychonoff fixed point theorem every compact and convex subset of a locally convex topological vector space has the FPP.  Compactness alone does not imply the FPP and convexity is not even a topological property so it makes sense to ask how to topologically characterize the FPP. In 1932 Borsuk asked whether compactness together with contractibility could be a sufficient condition for the FPP to hold. The problem was open for 20 years until the conjecture was disproved by Kinoshita who found an example of a compact contractible space without the FPP.

References

Fixed points (mathematics)